Balupu is a 2013 Indian Telugu-language action comedy film directed by Gopichand Malineni. The film is produced by Prasad Vara Potluri under his PVP cinema banner. The film stars Ravi Teja, Anjali, and Shruti Haasan along with Prakash Raj, Adivi Sesh, Ashutosh Rana, and Brahmanandam in supporting roles. The film soundtrack is composed by S. Thaman.

Released on 28 June 2013, the film was successful at the box office. It was remade in Bengali as Herogiri (2015). A Kannada remake titled Thrishulam is under production.

Plot 
Ravi works as a collection agent of ICICI bank in Bangalore and leads a happy life along with his friends and his father Mohan Rao. Mohan Rao wishes to see Ravi married to a girl soon although Ravi is against it. One day, Ravi is informed that one of his friends, Seenu has been admitted in the hospital as he tried to kill himself by drinking nail polish solution. Upon inquiring, Ravi finds out that his friend fell in love with a girl named Shruti. Shruti and her uncle Crazy Mohan, have a habit of cheating gullible young men in the name of love - including Seenu. Ravi decides to teach them a lesson.

Ravi enters their life as a gullible youngster after Shruti "falls in love with him", starts torturing them. Crazy Mohan's plans and attempts to let loose off Ravi always go in vain before him. Crazy Mohan, hatching upon a plan, tells Shruti to ask Ravi to marry her, thinking that Ravi will get cold feet and they would be rid of him. As fate would have it, Ravi, guessing their next move, also comes with a marriage proposal to Shruti. The pair, then, approach Mohan Rao and tell him that Ravi is in love with Shruti and that he proposed to her. They assume that this would enrage Mohan Rao, but Mohan Rao, happy that his son has finally fallen in love and wishes to marry a girl, accepts the proposal heartily. However, Shruti was already engaged to Rohit by her father sometime in the past. Their entire act of "cheating gullible young men" was just so that Shruti can have fun spending the last few days before getting married while Crazy Mohan can profit from it. One day, Ravi saves Shruti from some goons and finally comes off clean to Shruti as he believes that things have gone too far. He advises her not to play with people's feelings in future. Shruti finds herself falling in love with Ravi and informs Ravi's father Mohan Rao.

Mohan Rao leaves the final decision to Shruti's father and guarantees that they would not face any problem in the future from Ravi, if Shruti's father decides against the proposal. On the other hand, Rohit's mother, in a fit of anger after hearing all the events that have transpired, warns Shruti that she would torture her after her marriage. After listening to both of them, Shruti's father, realizes his mistake and fixes Shruti's marriage with Ravi. Rohit and his mother is humiliated, who calls her brother Poorna, a dreaded don in Vizag. After arriving at the wedding venue with his henchmen, Poorna recognises that Ravi and Mohan Rao are his former nemesis Shankar and Nanaji. While Ravi is fighting with the goons, Poorna stabs Mohan Rao, kidnaps Shruti and flees away to Vizag. After admitting Mohan Rao to the hospital, Ravi starts narrating his past.

Past: Nanaji was a dreaded gangster with an established crime empire in Vizag, while Poorna was still trying to establish his own regime. In view to destroying Nanaji's empire, Poorna takes the help of Shankar, a young upstart, and makes him a partner-in-crime. Shankar, with his aggressiveness and cleverness, starts destroying the empire of Nanaji. Meanwhile, he falls in love with Dr. Anjali, without knowing the fact that she was Nanaji's daughter. As Anjali is a person who believes in non-violence and hates goons, Shankar lies to her that he is only a struggling musician. Anjali, soon reciprocates his love. Knowing this, Poorna's elder son Babji, who always had a grudge against Shankar, tries to injure Anjali by throwing acid on her, only to be killed by Nanaji. At this point, she learns about Shankar's true identity. She pleads to both Shankar and Nanaji to leave the syndicate, and Shankar agrees.

Enraged by his son's death, instructs Shankar to kill Nanaji and Anjali. However, Shankar refuses and informs him that he has decided to quit. Kaasi, Poorna's younger son, advises Poorna to inform Nanaji that Shankar has kidnapped Anjali and will kill her. Nanaji, angered by this news, gathers his men and rushes to kill Shankar. Meanwhile, Shankar, having truly given up crime and wishing to marry Anjali, decides to approach Nanaji along with Anjali to seek his blessings. Nanaji on spotting them both, rushes to meet them head on. Kaasi too arrives at the same spot with his own men and attacks Nanaji's men. Thinking that they are all in league with Shankar, Nanaji retaliates and soon a feud takes place. Shankar, however, tries to stop the feud. In the ensuing chaos, Kaasi shoots Anjali, fatally wounding her. Enraged, Shankar promptly kills Kaasi and rushes to the hospital with Anjali. Anjali with a few moments left, reveals the truth to her father and requests him to leave the life of crime. Nanaji and Shankar, overcome with grief at the loss of Anjali's death, decide to leave Vizag for Bangalore to lead a normal life under their present names Ravi and Mohan Rao.

Present: Shruti's father rushes to the hospital and tells Ravi/Shankar that Shruti is kidnapped by Rohit forcibly. Ravi reaches Vizag and upon entering the household of Poorna acts as if though Kaasi's soul is in his body and it wants to kill Shankar and Nanaji. Poorna, a superstitious man believes this despite everybody else's misgivings. With the help of Shruti, Mohan Rao/Nanaji, Dr. Savitri and his friends, Ravi manages to kidnap Rohit. Poorna along with Shruti, reaches the spot where they are to make an exchange of Rohit for Shruti. However, after the exchange, Poorna reveals that he never believed in Ravi's act and he just went along with his story to trap Ravi and Mohan Rao. A final fight ensues and Ravi finally defeats Poorna and marries Shruti.

Cast

Production

Development 
Gopichand Malineni and Ravi Teja together announced that their collaboration is set for a new film whose name was revealed later. In August 2012, it was announced that the filming would begin from October 2012. The film's muhurtam was held on 26 October 2012 in a quiet ceremony held at producer Potluri's office.
A few of the film's songs were canned in Lisbon, Portugal thus making it the first Telugu film shot in Portugal. In an interview to the Portugal media, Ravi Teja, Shruti Haasan and Gopichand Malineni thanked the Portugal tourism board and the local crew for their support. In May, Gopichand Malineni responded about the delay in the film's shooting, stating "Balupu has been delayed due to fight masters and fighters union problems. Now Ram-Laxman masters have got Hyderabad union card and we are on the way." For the first time in his career, Ravi Teja sang a song, thus making this film his debut as a singer, adding yet another feather in his cap. As on 4 June, The post-production works were reported to be running in full-swing at  breakneck speed.

Casting 
Ravi Teja was signed to play the protagonist and his role was said to be a highly energetic one with a rugged look sporting a beard, similar to his look in his previous film Venky. This film was the next film of Ravi Teja with PVP Cinemas after the 2003 film Veede. Shruti Haasan has been recruited to play one of the female leads opposite Ravi Teja. She told IndiaGlitz that she would be playing a comedy role in the film and this will be her first attempt at comedy. For the first time in her career in Tollywood, she will be seen in a glamorous role. S. Thaman, who previously worked with Gopichand Malineni for Bodyguard, was recruited as the music director for this project. Kona Venkat penned the script for the film. In October, Anjali was recruited as the second female lead, after signing for Seethamma Vakitlo Sirimalle Chettu. After impressing everyone as a spoilt-brat in Panjaa, Adivi Sesh was recruited for a pivotal role in this film. Apparently, It was reported that Anjali is playing the role of a medical student in this film. Ashutosh Rana, who previously worked with Ravi Teja for Venky, was recruited to play one of the antagonists. Brahmaji was also recruited to play a vital role in the film. Meanwhile, Brahmanandam's character name was revealed to be "Crazy Mohan" and his role was said to be one of the biggest assets of the film. In May, it was reported that Lakshmi Rai would make a special appearance in the film. In June, it was reported that prominent Telugu comedian Ali would essay the role of Dr. Savitri, a male/female doctor, which was said to be one of the highlights of the film.

Filming 
The film shooting started on 13 November 2012 and had a silent shoot and in December, the film has completed its first schedule in which the scenes between Ravi Teja, Bramhanandam and Sruthi Hassan were shot. In the end of December, it was reported that shooting is currently progressing near Simhachalam and it was reported that the film is reportedly set in the backdrop of Vizag and some important scenes are being shot right now on Ravi Teja and Anjali. Later, it was told that the film has completed about 50% of the shoot and the work is going on at a good pace. The next schedule started in Hyderabad in January 2013 where scenes featuring Ravi Teja and Shruti Haasan were shot, which was confirmed by the actress on Twitter. The film's shooting was put on hold temporarily due to Gopichand Malineni's wedding and after a brief gap, the film's next schedule began in the end of February at Hyderabad, where some important scenes were canned between Ravi Teja and Shruti Haasan. In March, the song "Patikella Chinnadi" was shot on Ravi Teja and Shruti Haasan in Ramoji Film City and sources reported that Shruti Haasan will be seen in glamorous attire in that song. After the song's completion, the unit had its shoot at Appa Junction in Hyderabad for some crucial scenes at a very fast pace. After the completion of the major schedules, The film unit proceeded for the shooting of the remaining songs. Later it was known that few songs would be canned in Lisbon, the capital city of Portugal. After a shoot of 10 Days in Lisbon, the unit moved to Algarve region in Southern part of Portugal to shoot a couple of songs on Ravi Teja and Shruti Haasan. After completing 2 songs under the choreography of Raju Sundaram, The unit returned from Portugal nearly on 20 April 2013. The final schedule began at Hyderabad in the month of May. On 18 May, Some scenes were canned at Lingampally railway station in Hyderabad. After completion of the schedule nearly on 18 May, the unit proceeded to Bangkok for canning some crucial scenes. After completing a long schedule in Bangkok, the unit resumed its shooting in Nanakramguda, where some crucial scenes on Ravi Teja and Shruti Haasan were shot. The film unit then canned the song "Lucky Lucky Rai" on Ravi Teja and Lakshmi Rai at Bangkok. It was informed that Sekhar master is choreographing that song and shooting will go on till 15 June, with which the shooting of the film will be complete. Finally, shooting came to an end on 15 June.

Soundtrack 

The music was composed by S. Thaman. This film marks Thaman's second venture with Gopichand Malineni after Bodyguard and also his sixth venture with Ravi Teja. Sirivennela Sitaramasastri and Bhaskarabhatla penned the lyrics for the songs. Ravi Teja also sung a song in this film. The film had its audio launch in Hyderabad International Convention Centre at Hyderabad on 1 June 2013.

Reception 
The audio got a positive response. 123telugu.com gave a review stating "Balupu is one of the most commercially promising audio albums that Ravi Teja has had in recent times. The songs are peppy and are easy to like." APHerald.com gave a review stating "Over all Balupu audio sounded as a mix of a new and old track from Thaman’s previous movies." Telugucinema.com gave a review stating "All in all, Balupu is different in Thaman's repertoire and has songs that are easy to like. Thaman has come up with songs that would help the film. Has mass numbers as well as a melody number. The right mix of songs. Best album in Ravi Teja's career in the recent times." Cineoutlook.com gave a review stating: "Overall Balupu Audio is a combination of Class and Mass Masala songs. It’s a S.S. Thaman Brand Music."

Release 
Initially, the film was slated for a worldwide released on 302 screens on 21 June 2013. But due to delays in post-production of the film, the release date was shifted to 28 June 2013. The film would have a premiere on 27 June 2013 in all the overseas countries. Though it was rumoured that the film would be delayed further, the unit confirmed its release on 28 June 2013. The film was submitted to the Central Board of Film Certification on 24 June 2013. The film was awarded an A certificate by the Board after the objectionable dialogue was removed. The film released in 70 screens across USA, making it the biggest release of Ravi Teja there. With a massive release in AP, the film was also released in and around Chennai on 16 Screens.

Marketing 
It was reported in the first week of January that the first look posters and stills would be released on 26 January 2013, thus coinciding with Ravi Teja's birthday, but the logo and teaser of Balupu were launched at a function organized in Marigold Hotel at Greenlands, Hyderabad on 25 January 2013. Ravi Teja launched the teaser, while PVP's executive director Rajeev Kamineni launched the logo. The audio launch was held on 1 June 2013 at HICC Novotel in Hyderabad. It was organised by Shreyas Media, a popular event organizing company. The cost of organizing was  3.5 million, which was well-received, both in terms of TRP's and public response, making it one of the successful events organized by them. For the first time ever, Ravi Teja and Shruti Hassan performed live on stage along with S. Thaman, which elevated the event to Bollywood and Hollywood standards. The theatrical trailer, which was released on the same day generated an unusually positive response from the public. From 18 June 2013, the character sketches of Ali, Srinivasa Reddy, Satyam Rajesh, Pradeep, Thagubothu Ramesh, Ashutosh Rana, Lakshmi Rai, Adivi Sesh, Anjali, Prakash Raj, Shruti Haasan, Brahmanandam, Ravi Teja were displayed at idlebrain.com, the official web partners of the film in images with a countdown till 28 June 2013 which was told as a unique promotion. Moreover, the posters of the film were decorated on 3 trains, covering all parts of Andhra Pradesh nearly on 26 June 2013, which was also a unique promotion activity.

Pre-release revenues 
Noted producer and distributor Dil Raju bought the Nizam area rights of the film for a reported fancy prize. The overseas rights were secured by BlueSky for a fancy price. Zee Telugu bought the satellite rights of the film. The Australian distribution rights of this film, along with Sahasam, were secured by Sai Manali and Lorgan Entertainment. The film had a great pre-release business in USA, with 33 centers in USA were closed within 48 to 72 hours of press note and remaining in final stages of closing, with all Non USA centers closed as on 21 June 2013.

Controversy 
On 20 June 2013 Mr. Dronamraju Ravikumar, representative of the A.P. Brahmana Seva Sangha Samakhya, alleged that the trailer of the film contained derogatory remarks against Brahmins. The representatives of Brahmin organizations demanded the removal of trailers from all TV channels, thus submitting a formal complaint to the Censor Board and the Film Chamber with an intention of necessary action by the Censor Board since the film was not censored by that time. On the other hand, Gopichand Malineni stated that his intention was not to hurt anyone's feelings but just to conclude the controversy in a positive manner in this film and concluded saying that the Brahmin organizations are invited to watch the film before it gets censored. After showing the film to the irked community, the producer of the film sent a letter to Regional Censor Board Officer stating that he is going to delete the entire scene from the film to avoid controversies.

Reception 
Jeevi of idlebrain.com gave a review of rating 3.25/5 stating "Ravi Teja whose previous hit was released in January 2011 didn't find success at the box office despite having seven films in a span of 2 and half years. Balupu will provide oxygen to his career. Balupu has all ingredients with a dominating portion of entertainment to become a decent hit. You can watch it." The Times of India gave a review stating "The first half of the film looks pretty entertaining with good comedy, emotions and interval bang. Kona Venkat's comic drama style coupled with Gopichand Malineni's well-shot action sequences hogged the limelight in the second half, where the story gets into the flash back. Powerful dialogues, emotions and nice comedy might engage the audience." Postnoon.com gave a review of rating 3.5/5 stating "Balupu is a good concoction of action and entertainment which hits all the right notes. Ravi Teja has finally managed to hit the ball out of the park, after almost two years." Mahesh S Koneru of 123telugu.com gave a rating of 3.25/5 stating "With Balupu, we can perhaps say that Ravi Teja is back! His mass look and powerful punch dialogues work well. It ends up being a mass masala entertainer that is definitely worth a watch." Oneindia Entertainment gave a review stating "Ravi Teja is back with a bang this time. With repeated failures till now, it is refreshing to watch Ravi Teja at his best." IndiaGlitz gave a review of rating 3.25/5 stating "Balupu is a mix of action plus entertainment. Ravi Teja will win a battle for the first time since Mirapakay." APHerald gave a review of rating 2.25/5 stating "Balupu is not a complete action entertainer, but watchable once for Ravi Teja-Brahmi comedy." SuperGoodMovies gave a review of rating 3/5 stating "Raviteja’s Balupu is a movie with entertainment and action sequences. But it is just one time watch."

Home Media 
The film was aired for the first time on 12 January 2014 as Sankranti special on Zee Telugu Channel which generated Huge TRP's for the channel.

Box office 
The film has collected  (WW Share) at the box office. The film becomes the highest-grossing film of Ravi Teja's career. The film was declared a "Blockbuster" both overseas and in India.

India 
The film had a good start at the domestic box office, collecting  on its first day. The film collected  4025,000 in 3 days in Tamil Nadu, which is the highest collection for a Ravi Teja film in Tamil Nadu till date, hence being declared a Super Hit at both Andhra Pradesh and Tamil Nadu Box offices respectively, breaking Ravi Teja's previous records held by Kick, Don Seenu and Mirapakay. The film continued its pace by collecting  at the end of the first week and with steady collections in the second week even after finding a stiff competition from Singam, the successful dubbed version of Suriya's Singam II. The film completed a successful 50 day run in 85 direct centers, collecting a gross of nearly  all over the state.

Overseas 
At the US box office, the film collected  in three days, entering the list of the top 20 grossers in the US at 18th position, minting more than Ghanchakkar, which was released on more screens and collected . The film collected  in its first weekend, which was more than the closing businesses of his previous hits; Kick (with ), Don Seenu (with ) and Mirapakay (with ) respectively. The film continued its pace in spite of heavy competition from other big releases by collecting  at the end of the second week, however failing to beat the record set by Baadshah, which collected  at that point of time, however subjected to the number of screens it was released.

Remake 
It was remade as Herogiri in Bengali, starring Dev, Koel Mallick, Sayantika and Mithun Chakraborty. The film which was being remade in Kannada as Ravichandra starring Upendra and Ravichandran was shelved after partial completion of shooting.

References

External links 
 

2013 films
2010s action comedy-drama films
Telugu films remade in other languages
Films shot in Portugal
Films shot in Lisbon
Films shot in Bangalore
Films shot in Visakhapatnam
Films scored by Thaman S
Indian action comedy-drama films
Indian gangster films
Films directed by Gopichand Malineni
2013 comedy films